The 1952 NBA All-Star Game was an exhibition basketball game played on February 11, 1952, at Boston Garden in Boston, home of the Boston Celtics. The game was the second edition of the National Basketball Association (NBA) All-Star Game and was played during the 1951–52 NBA season. The Eastern All-Stars team defeated the Western All-Stars team 108–91. This was the East's second successive win over the West. Philadelphia Warriors' Paul Arizin, who led the East with 26 points, was named as the All-Star Game Most Valuable Player.

Roster
The players for the All-Star Game were chosen by sports writers in several cities. They were not allowed to select players from their own cities. Players were selected without regard to position. Ten players from each Division were selected to represent the Eastern and Western Division in the All-Star Game. However, Dolph Schayes and Larry Foust suffered injuries and were unable to participate in the game; two other players were added to the roster. Nine players from the previous year's Eastern All-Stars roster returned for their second straight selection. Only seven players from the previous year's Western All-Stars roster returned. Six players, Leo Barnhorst, Arnie Risen, Fred Scolari, Paul Walther, Bobby Wanzer and Max Zaslofsky, were selected for the first time. Four teams, the Minneapolis Lakers, the New York Knickerbockers, the Philadelphia Warriors and the Rochester Royals, were represented by three players each on the roster. The starters were chosen by each team's head coach. Minneapolis Lakers head coach John Kundla returned to coach the Western All-Stars for the second straight year. Syracuse Nationals head coach Al Cervi was named as the Eastern All-Stars head coach.

Game

The East defeated the West for the second successive year. The West trailed by four and five points at the end of the first and second quarter respectively. Then the East outscored the West by six points in the third and fourth quarter to win the game by 17 points. Philadelphia Warriors' Paul Arizin and Minneapolis Lakers' George Mikan both scored a game-high 26 points. Mikan also added a game-high 15 rebounds but his team only had a 35.9 field goal percentage. On the other hand, six Eastern players scored in double figures as their team made 49.4 percent of its shots. Boston Celtics guard Bob Cousy also recorded a game-high 13 assists for the East. Arizin was named as the All-Star Game Most Valuable Player. However, he was honored a year later during the 1953 All-Star Game, when the league decided to designate an MVP for each year's game.

Box score

References
General

Specific

External links
NBA All-Star Game History
NBA.com: All-Star Game: Year-by-Year Results

1952
All-Star Game
NBA All-Star Game, 1952
1950s in Boston
1952 in sports in Massachusetts
February 1952 sports events in the United States